Alwin Addison (27 October 1887 – 31 July 1971) was an Australian-born cricketer who played two matches of first-class cricket for Canterbury in 1910.

He spent his working life with the Union Bank of Australia, first in Australia, then in New Zealand from 1909 to 1918, then in Australia again, until he retired in 1950.

References

External links

1887 births
New Zealand cricketers
Canterbury cricketers
1971 deaths